"Not Falling Apart" is a song by American pop rock band Maroon 5 from the group's second studio album, It Won't Be Soon Before Long (2007). Although the original version wasn't released as a single, a remix of the song was released as a single and charted at number 3 on the Hot Dance Club Play chart. It was written by band frontman Adam Levine, with production of the song helmed by Mike Elizondo, Mark "Spike" Stent and Maroon 5.

Background 
"Not Falling Apart" features a "whisper croon" from singer Adam Levine. Like many early Maroon 5 songs, "Not Falling Apart" is about heartbreak. The instrumentation in the verse of the song has been compared to the Police's song, "Every Breath You Take".

A separate song with the same name was recorded and performed live while the band were called Kara's Flowers. This song was featured on the Stagg Street Recordings. "Not Falling Apart" has been played very few times live by the band. It made its live debut in late 2005, making it one of the first songs from the album performed live (the first being "Can't Stop").

Remix 
A version of the song, which was remixed by Dutch producer Tiësto, was featured on Call and Response: The Remix Album and released as a promotional single in the Netherlands and the USA. The remix peaked at number three on  the Billboard Hot Dance Club Play chart in 2009.

Charts
The remix of the song debuted at No. 34 on the Billboard Dance Club chart on February 7, 2009. It peaked at No. 3 on April 4 of that year during a 13-week stay on the chart.

Weekly charts

Credits and personnel
All credits adapted from the album liner notes.
Maroon 5
 Adam Levine – lead and backing vocals, rhythm and lead guitars
 Jesse Carmichael – keyboards, backing vocals
 Mickey Madden – bass guitar
 James Valentine – lead and rhythm guitars, backing vocals
 Matt Flynn – drums, percussion
 Ryan Dusick – musical director

Production
 Mike Elizondo – production, additional keyboards
 Mark "Spike" Stent - production
 Adam Hawkins - Pro Tools engineer 
 Alex Dromgoole - mix assistant
 David Emery - mix assistant

References

2007 songs
2008 singles
Maroon 5 songs
Songs written by Adam Levine